The  was held on 3 February 2019 at Yokohama, Kanagawa, Japan. The awards ceremony was held in the city's , the results having been announced on 1 December 2018.

Awards
 Best Film: - Asako I & II 
 Best Director: 
 Ryusuke Hamaguchi - Asako I & II
 Yoshimitsu Morita Memorial Best New Director:  - 
 Best Screenplay:  - 
 Best Cinematographer:  - Asako I & II and 
 Best Actor: 
 Masahiro Higashide - Asako I & II, and Over Drive
 Kōji Yakusho - The Blood of Wolves
 Best Actress: Sakura Ando - Shoplifters
 Best Supporting Actor: Tori Matsuzaka - The Blood of Wolves
 Best Supporting Actress: 
 Mayu Matsuoka - Shoplifters, and Chihayafuru Part 3
 Sairi Ito - Asako I & II and Enokida Trading Post
 Best Newcomer:
 Erika Karata - Asako I & II
 Ryo Yoshizawa - [[River's Edge (2018 film)|River's Edge]],  Gintama 2: The Law is Surely There to be Broken, and Marmalade Boy 
  -  and  Judges' Special Award: One Cut of the Dead Special Grand Prize: Tsutomu Yamazaki - Top 10
 Asako I & II The Blood of Wolves Shoplifters Hanagatami One Cut of the Dead     runner-up. ''

References

Yokohama Film Festival
Yokohama Film Festival
2019 in Japanese cinema
2018 film awards